Krzysztof Czerwinski (born January 13, 1980) is a Polish conductor, organist and voice teacher.
 
Czerwinski studied at Wieniawski School of music (Poznań, Poland), Eastman School of Music (University of Rochester, New York, US) and Birmingham Conservatoire (University of Central England, Birmingham, UK).

He has won many national and international competitions, awards, scholarships and gives performances throughout Europe and the USA.

On the basis of his artistic attainment, he has received prizes from Minister of Culture and Arts, and Ministry of Culture and National Heritage in Poland.
 
Czerwinski is founder, Conductor and Artistic Director of the Polish Baroque Orchestra and Artistic Director of the Komorniki Festival of Organ and Chamber Music in Poland.

He has served as accompanist, Assistant Conductor/Artistic Director and voice teacher for the Poznań Cathedral Choir of Men and Boys (Poznań, Poland).

References

External links 
 Krzysztof Czerwinski’s website
 Biography of Krzysztof Czerwinski – Polish Music Information Centre

1980 births
Living people
Polish conductors (music)
Male conductors (music)
Polish classical organists
Male classical organists
Cathedral organists
Alumni of Birmingham Conservatoire
21st-century conductors (music)
21st-century organists
21st-century male musicians
Musicians from Poznań